The 79th Academy Awards ceremony, presented by the Academy of Motion Picture Arts and Sciences (AMPAS), honored the best films of 2006 and took place February 25, 2007, at the Kodak Theatre in Hollywood, Los Angeles beginning at 5:30 p.m. PST / 8:30 p.m. EST. During the ceremony, the Academy of Motion Picture Arts and Sciences presented Academy Awards (commonly referred to as Oscars) in 24 categories. The ceremony, televised in the United States by ABC, was produced by Laura Ziskin and directed by Louis J. Horvitz. Actress Ellen DeGeneres hosted for the first time. Two weeks earlier in a ceremony at the Beverly Wilshire Hotel in Beverly Hills, California held on February 10, the Academy Awards for Technical Achievement were presented by host Maggie Gyllenhaal.

The Departed won four awards, including Best Picture. Other winners included Pan's Labyrinth with three awards, Dreamgirls, An Inconvenient Truth, and Little Miss Sunshine with two, and Babel, The Blood of Yingzhou District, The Danish Poet, Happy Feet, The Last King of Scotland, Letters from Iwo Jima, The Lives of Others, Marie Antoinette, Pirates of the Caribbean: Dead Man's Chest, The Queen, and West Bank Story with one. The telecast garnered nearly 40 million viewers in the United States.

Winners and nominees

The nominees for the 79th Academy Awards were announced on January 23, 2007, at the Samuel Goldwyn Theater in Beverly Hills, California, by Sid Ganis, president of the Academy, and the actress Salma Hayek. Dreamgirls received the most nominations with eight, and Babel came in second with seven. This marked the first and only occurrence that the film with the most nominations was not a Best Picture nominee.

The winners were announced during the awards ceremony on February 25, 2007. With his latest unsuccessful nomination for Best Actor, Peter O'Toole became the most nominated performer without a competitive win. Best Supporting Actress winner Jennifer Hudson became the fifteenth person to win for their debut film performance. "I Need to Wake Up" from An Inconvenient Truth became the first song from a documentary film to win Best Original Song.

Awards

Winners are listed first, highlighted in boldface, and indicated with a double dagger.

Honorary Academy Award
Ennio Morricone  In recognition of his magnificent and multifaceted contributions to the art of film music.

Jean Hersholt Humanitarian Award
Sherry Lansing

Films with multiple nominations and awards

The following 19 films received multiple nominations:

The following five films received multiple awards:

Presenters and performers
The following individuals presented awards or performed musical numbers.

Presenters (in order of appearance)

Performers (in order of appearance)

Ceremony information

Because of the declining viewership of recent Academy Awards ceremonies, producer Gil Cates declined to helm the upcoming festivities. The Academy sought ideas to revamp the show while renewing interest with the nominated films. In September 2006, the Academy selected producer Laura Ziskin to oversee production of the telecast for a second time. Nearly three months later, actress and comedian Ellen DeGeneres, who had previously emceed three Primetime Emmy Award ceremonies between 2001 and 2005, was chosen as host of the 2007 ceremony. In an article published in the Los Angeles Times, Ziskin explained the decision to hire DeGeneres saying "Certainly, I believe the presence of Ellen will help the ratings absolutely. She's popular with a very wide audience. She is not a niche performer. She touches a lot of demographics."

AMPAS christened this year's telecast with a theme celebrating movie quotes. In tandem with the theme, advertising agency TBWA\Chiat\Day designed the official ceremony poster featuring 75 quotes from several Oscar-nominated or winning films. To stir interest surrounding the awards, filmmaker Spike Lee released a trailer featuring everyday people around New York City reciting famous film lines. During the ceremony, a montage produced by director Nancy Meyers saluted the work of screenwriters and their contributions to film.

During the telecast, former U.S. Vice President and environmental activist Al Gore, and Best Actor nominee Leonardo DiCaprio announced that AMPAS would incorporate several environmentally and ecologically conscious features into the ceremony. Designed by Frank Webb and Matthew White, the Architectural Digest greenroom where presenters and winners mingled backstage featured several environmentally friendly features such as a rug made of recycled plastic bottles and walls painted without any volatile organic compounds. Other eco-friendly features included the transportation for guests of the awards via hybrid electric vehicles, usage of recyclable paper for ballots and invitations, and serving meals at the Governor's Ball on reusable plates and biodegradable dishware.

Several other people participated in the production of the ceremony. William Ross served as musical director for the ceremony. J. Michael Riva designed a new set and stage design for the ceremony. Voice actor Don LaFontaine was hired with Gina Tuttle as announcers for the telecast. Actor Greg Vaughan and Lucky columnist Allyson Waterman co-hosted "Road to the Oscars", a weekly behind-the-scenes video blog on the Oscar ceremony website. Members of the dance troupe and contortionist group Pilobolus performed interpretive shadow figures representing scenes and logos from the nominated films. Actors Jack Black, Will Ferrell, and John C. Reilly performed a lighthearted musical number written by comedic director Judd Apatow and music composer Marc Shaiman satirizing comedy's lack of recognition at the Academy Awards. Conducted by musician Steve Sidwell, the Sound Effects Choir performed voice effects to a montage of classic films. Another vignette directed by documentary filmmaker Errol Morris featuring several Oscar nominees discussing what it means to be an Oscar nominee was shown at the beginning of the show. Italian director Giuseppe Tornatore assembled a tribute highlighting previous winners of the Best Foreign Language Film. Filmmaker Michael Mann produced a montage highlighting American life through the eyes of cinema.

Box office performance of nominated films
At the time of the nominations announcement on January 23, the combined gross of the five Best Picture nominees was $244 million with an average of $48.7 million per film. The Departed was the highest earner among the Best Picture nominees with $121.7 million in domestic box office receipts. The film was followed by Little Miss Sunshine ($59.6 million), The Queen ($35.6 million), Babel ($23.7 million) and finally Letters from Iwo Jima ($2.4 million).

Of the top 50 grossing movies of the year, 29 nominations went to nine films on the list. Only The Pursuit of Happyness (12th), Borat: Cultural Learnings of America for Make Benefit Glorious Nation of Kazakhstan (15th), The Devil Wears Prada (16th), The Departed (17th) and Dreamgirls (28th) were nominated for Best Picture, Best Animated Feature or any of the directing, acting or screenwriting awards. The other top 50 box office hits that earned nominations were Pirates of the Caribbean: Dead Man's Chest (1st), Cars (2nd), Superman Returns (6th) and Happy Feet (8th).

Critical reviews
The show received a mixed reception from media publications. Some media outlets were more critical of the show. Tim Goodman of the San Francisco Chronicle lamented, "It was long. It was flat. And it was bloated. Worst of all, it was boring." He also wrote that "it was difficult for Ellen's subtle rambling to translate because people want pop and humor and declarative sentences in their Academy Awards. Which they didn't exactly get." The Denver Post television critic Joanne Ostrow bemoaned, "Pleasant and innocuous but hardly exciting, DeGeneres forgot the primary Academy Award host directive: It's not about the host. Hollywood's biggest night (and television's second-biggest annual gathering, after the Super Bowl) is a celebration of film." The Washington Post columnist Tom Shales gave an average review for DeGeneres but criticized the overall slow and choppy pacing of the program noting that it was "punishingly too long."

Other media outlets received the broadcast more positively. Columnist Alessandra Stanley of The New York Times lauded DeGeneres's performance writing that she was "cheeky but good-natured, far less barbed and sardonic than Jon Stewart last year or Chris Rock in 2005." She added that her style brought a "casual Friday mood to Fancy Sunday." St. Louis Post-Dispatch television critic Gail Pennington praised host DeGeneres and producer Ziskin for turning "the evening into an upbeat celebration––and the most entertaining Oscars in years." Television editor Dave Kronke of the Los Angeles Daily News gave high marks for DeGeneres commenting, "Her material was amusing but scarcely a laugh riot, yet it was amiable and delineated that the evening was a celebration of all the nominees, not just the winners."

Ratings and reception
The American telecast on ABC drew in an average of 39.92 million people over its length, which was a 2.5% increase from the previous year's ceremony. An estimated 76.72 million total viewers watched all or part of the awards. The show also drew higher Nielsen ratings compared to the previous ceremony with 23.59% of households watching over a 38.86 share. In addition, the program scored a higher 18-49 demo rating with a 14.18 rating over a 33.71 share among viewers in that demographic.

In July 2007, the ceremony presentation received nine nominations at the 59th Primetime Emmys. Two months later, the ceremony won two of those nominations for Outstanding Art Direction (J. Michael Riva, Geoffrey Richman, and Tamlyn Wright) and Outstanding Music Direction (William Ross).

In Memoriam
The annual In Memoriam tribute, presented by actress Jodie Foster, honored the following people:

Glenn Ford - Actor
Bruno Kirby - Character actor, comedian
Alida Valli - Actress
Betty Comden – Songwriter
Jane Wyatt - Actress
Don Knotts - Actor, comedian
Red Buttons - Actor, comedian
Gillo Pontecorvo – Director
Darren McGavin - Actor
Richard Fleischer – Director
Sven Nykvist – Cinematographer
Joseph Barbera – Producer, cartoonist
Tamara Dobson - Actor, model
Gretchen Rau – Set designer
June Allyson - Actress
Gordon Parks – Director
Philippe Noiret - Actor
Maureen Stapleton - Actress
Jack Wild - Actor
Vincent Sherman – Director
James Doohan - Actor
Shohei Imamura – Director
Carlo Ponti – Producer
Peter Boyle - Character actor
James Glennon – Cinematographer
Sidney Sheldon – Screenwriter
Jack Palance - Actor
Mako - Actor
Jack Warden - Character actor
Basil Poledouris – Composer
Henry Bumstead – Art director
Jay Presson Allen – Screenwriter
Robert Altman – Director

Before the montage was shown, Foster briefly eulogized casting director and Oscar winner Randy Stone who died nearly two weeks before the ceremony.

See also

 13th Screen Actors Guild Awards
 27th Golden Raspberry Awards
 49th Grammy Awards
 59th Primetime Emmy Awards
 60th British Academy Film Awards
 61st Tony Awards
 64th Golden Globe Awards
 List of submissions to the 79th Academy Awards for Best Foreign Language Film

References

Bibliography

External links

 Academy Awards Official website
 The Academy of Motion Picture Arts and Sciences Official website
 Oscar's Channel at YouTube (run by the Academy of Motion Picture Arts and Sciences)

News resources
 Oscars 2007 BBC News
 Academy Awards coverage CNN

Analysis
 2006 Academy Awards Winners and History Filmsite
 Academy Awards, USA: 2007 Internet Movie Database

Other resources

Academy Awards ceremonies
2006 film awards
2007 in Los Angeles
2007 in American cinema
2007 awards in the United States
February 2007 events in the United States
Television shows directed by Louis J. Horvitz